Jablonka may refer to:
Eva Jablonka (born 1952), Israeli biologist
Jablonka, Myjava, a village in Slovakia

See also
 Jabłonka (disambiguation), several places in Poland